Abd Halim bin Jusoh is a Malaysian politician and served as former Deputy of Terengganu State Executive Councillor.

Election Results

Honours 
  :
  Companion Class II of the Exalted Order of Malacca (DPSM) – Datuk (2013)

References

Living people
People from Terengganu
Malaysian people of Malay descent
United Malays National Organisation politicians
Members of the Terengganu State Legislative Assembly
Terengganu state executive councillors
21st-century Malaysian politicians
Year of birth missing (living people)